Ribnjak may refer to:

 Ribnjak, Zagreb, a neighborhood and park in Zagreb, Croatia
 Ribnjak, Novi Sad, a neighborhood in Novi Sad, Serbia
 Tivoli Pond, a pond in Tivoli Park in Ljubljana, Slovenia
 Ribnjak, Koprivnica-Križevci County, a village near Rasinja, Croatia